A reed pen (singular  ) is a writing implement made by cutting and shaping a single reed straw or length of bamboo.

History and manufacture

Reed pens with regular features such as a split nib have been found in Ancient Egyptian sites dating from the 4th century BC. Reed pens were used for writing on papyrus, and were the most common writing implement in antiquity. In Mesopotamia and Sumer, reed pens were used by pressing the tips into clay tablets to create written records, using cuneiform. 

To make a reed pen, scribes would take an undamaged piece of reed about 20 cm long, and leave the end that would be cut into point in water for some time. This ensured that the pen would not splinter when cut. They crafted a series of cuts that would cut the nib of the pen until it was flat enough, and pointed. The pointed end was then cut off, not too far from the point, to form a squared end suitable for writing. At the end they would start the split, which would act as a primitive ink barrel, from the tip of the nib and lengthen it until it was of the proper length. They made care not to lengthen it extensively, because the pen was at risk of snapping in half. Being skilled at making reed pens was important for early scribes due to low durability of the pen.

Reed pens are stiffer than quill pens cut from feathers and do not retain a sharp point for as long. This led to them being replaced by quills. Nevertheless, a reed pen can make bold strokes, and it remains an important tool in calligraphy.

Reed pen in art 

Although quill pens had largely replaced reed pens by medieval times, from time to time the powerful strokes produced by the reed pen have been preferred by modern artists. Until the end of the 19th century, most art was commissioned by wealthy patrons or by institutions such as the church. As such, more traditional depictions of accepted themes were both the most popular and widely accepted. During the 19th century, social and cultural changes were reflected in literature and art. With this, artists began to explore different ways to express their vision and create their own personal style.  Artist Vincent van Gogh made use of the strong stroke and accent of the reed pen, combining it with brown ink and graphite, to create a drawing of a different style.

See also
 Penknife
 Qalam, Arabian reed pen
 List of pen types, brands and companies

References

External links
"A Light Note on the Science of Writing and Inks" (1852): an Arabic manuscript about reed pens

Writing implements
Pens